The 2001 AIG Japan Open Tennis Championships was a tennis tournament played on outdoor hard courts at the Ariake Coliseum in Tokyo in Japan that was part of the International Series Gold of the 2001 ATP Tour and of Tier III of the 2001 WTA Tour. The tournament ran from October 1 through October 7, 2001. Lleyton Hewitt and Monica Seles won the singles titles.

Finals

Men's singles

 Lleyton Hewitt defeated  Michel Kratochvil 6–4, 6–2
 It was Hewitt's 5th title of the year and the 13th of his career.

Women's singles

 Monica Seles defeated  Tamarine Tanasugarn 6–3, 6–2
 It was Seles' 3rd title of the year and the 56th of her career.

Men's doubles

 Rick Leach /  David Macpherson defeated  Paul Hanley /  Nathan Healey 1–6, 7–6(8–6), 7–6(7–4)
 It was Leach's 1st title of the year and the 41st of his career. It was Macpherson's 2nd title of the year and the 15th of his career.

Women's doubles

 Liezel Huber /  Rachel McQuillan defeated  Janet Lee /  Wynne Prakusya 6–2, 6–0
 It was Huber's 2nd title of the year and the 2nd of her career. It was McQuillan's only title of the year and the 5th of her career.

References

External links
 Official website
 ATP tournament profile

AIG Japan Open Tennis Championships
AIG Japan Open Tennis Championships
Japan Open (tennis)
AIG Japan Open Tennis Championships
Japan Open Tennis Championships